Sabir Masani is an Indian actor who played the role of Yeda in Satya and similar small and significant roles in Asoka, Company and Bhoot.

Filmography
Satya (1998) as Yedaa
Dil Se.. (1998) as terrorist
Company (2002) as David Khan
Asoka (2001)
Bhoot (2003) as Watchman

References

Indian male film actors
Living people
Year of birth missing (living people)
Place of birth missing (living people)
Male actors in Hindi cinema